Anouck Lepère (born 13 February 1979 in Antwerp, Flanders) is a Belgian model.

Lepère was studying architecture in Antwerp, when she was persuaded by her friends Dries van Noten and Olivier Theyskens to try modelling. She first appeared on the runways in Paris in 2000 and is currently signed with IMG Models. She also worked as a model for Delvaux and the Hugo Boss "Woman" and "Deep Red" perfumes, and with Steven Meisel, Mario Testino, Inez van Lamsweerde and Vinoodh Matadin. Lepere was on the covers of Vogue, Harper's Bazaar, Marie Claire, and French Playboy. She has her own line of jewellery.

References

External links
 
 
 
 Anouck Lepere videos at WN

Belgian female models
Models from Antwerp
Living people
1979 births